The 1983 European Weightlifting Championships were held at the Izmailovo Sports Palace in Moscow, Soviet Union from October 22 to October 31, 1983. This was the 62nd edition of the event. There were 123 men in action from 21 nations. This tournament was a part of 1983 World Weightlifting Championships.

Medal summary

Medal table
Ranking by Big (Total result) medals

References
Results (Chidlovski.net)
Панорама спортивного года 1983 / Сост. А. Н. Корольков — М.: Физкультура и спорт, 1984. 

European Weightlifting Championships
European Weightlifting Championships
European Weightlifting Championships
International weightlifting competitions hosted by the Soviet Union
Sports competitions in Moscow